Richard Lásik (born 18 August 1992) is a Slovak football midfielder who plays for FC Andau.

Club career

Early career
Born in Bratislava, Lásik began his career at Slovan Bratislava before departing in 2004 for the Jozef Vengloš Academy. Lásik spent three years at the club before being spotted by renowned Brescia. On 25 January 2012, Richard joined MFK Ružomberok on loan until the end of the season. He made his MFK Ružomberok debut in the Slovak Corgoň Liga against Spartak Trnava on 9 March 2012.

On 25 August 2016, he moved to Italy and joined Avellino.

After not playing in the 2018–19 season, on 6 August 2019 he signed a 2-year contract with Serie C club Teramo.

FK Pohronie
In late September 2021, Lásik signed a deal with Pohronie of the Fortuna Liga until the end of the year, with both parties having the option to extend. At the time, Pohronie was ranked last in the league table. Upon his arrival, Lásik admitted a burden of responsibility to elevate the team in the rankings and praised the conditions in the club. He went on to be released during the winter break after competing in 8 games.

International career
Lásik was a Slovakia Under-21 international and made his debut for the full Slovakia national football team on 6 February 2013 in an international friendly against Belgium in Bruges, Jan Breydel Stadium, the game ended in a 2–1 loss for Slovakia. In this match he scored equalizing goal to make the score 1–1.

References

External links
Talenty-info.sk profile

1992 births
Living people
Footballers from Bratislava
Slovak footballers
Slovakia youth international footballers
Slovakia under-21 international footballers
Slovakia international footballers
Slovak expatriate footballers
Association football midfielders
Brescia Calcio players
MFK Ružomberok players
ŠK Slovan Bratislava players
U.S. Avellino 1912 players
S.S. Teramo Calcio players
FK Pohronie players
FC Košice (2018) players
FC Petržalka players
Serie B players
Slovak Super Liga players
2. Liga (Slovakia) players
Czech First League players
Serie C players
Expatriate footballers in Italy
Slovak expatriate sportspeople in Italy
Expatriate footballers in the Czech Republic
Slovak expatriate sportspeople in the Czech Republic